Steve Vetter is an American politician serving as a member of the North Dakota House of Representatives from the 18th district. Elected in November 2016, he assumed office on December 1, 2016.

Education 
Vetter earned a Bachelor of Science degree in business administration and organizational leadership from the University of Mary in Bismarck, North Dakota.

Career 
Outside of politics, Vetter works as a real estate property appraiser. He was previously a union-affiliated cement finisher and cement mason. Vetter was elected to the North Dakota House of Representatives in November 2018 and assumed office on December 1, 2016. Vetter is a member of the House Judiciary Committee and the House Government & Veterans Affairs Committee.

References 

Living people
University of Mary alumni
Republican Party members of the North Dakota House of Representatives
Year of birth missing (living people)